The RFL Yorkshire Cup is a rugby league county cup competition for teams in Yorkshire. Starting in 1905 the competition ran, with the exception of 1915 to 1918, until the 1992–93 season, when it folded due to fixture congestion. In 2019, the competition was relaunched as a pre-season tournament, but not all Yorkshire clubs were invited, hence it is not a legitimate running of the competition, and was not played for ahead of the 2020 season.

The competition was open to all senior member clubs of the Rugby Football League in Yorkshire and was normally played in the opening months of the season. On two occasions, 1918–19 and 1940–41 the competition was held towards the end of the season due to the two world wars. During the Second World War the Lancashire Cup was not played for between 1941 and 1945 and several Lancashire clubs were admitted into the Yorkshire Cup competition instead. The cup finals in 1942, 1943 and 1944 were played over two legs with the winner being determined by aggregate score over the two matches.

Between 1966 and 1993 a trophy, called the White Rose Trophy, was awarded to the man of the match in each final. The judging was conducted by members of the press.

Cup finals

Wins by club

Sponsors

Results

See also

RFL Yorkshire League

References

 
Rugby league competitions in Yorkshire
Rugby league competitions in the United Kingdom
1905 establishments in England
1992 disestablishments in England
2019 establishments in England
Recurring sporting events established in 1905
Recurring sporting events disestablished in 1992
Recurring sporting events established in 2019